42nd Street station could refer to:
 Times Square – 42nd Street / Port Authority Bus Terminal (New York City Subway)
 42nd Street – Bryant Park / Fifth Avenue (New York City Subway)
 Grand Central – 42nd Street (New York City Subway)